The New Age of Terror is the third studio album by American thrash metal band Hirax and the first after their reunion. It consisted of new members with an added guitarist, now making it a five-piece band. The final track "Unleash the Dogs of War (Open the Gates)" opens with a quote from the 2003 film Underworld.

Track listing

Personnel
 Katon W. De Pena (Bobby Johnson) - vocals
 Glenn Rogers - guitar
 Dave Watson - guitar
 Angelo Espino - bass
 Jorge Iacobellis - drums

Production
 Michael Rozon - production, recording
 Marc Jacquette - photography
 Didier Scohier - artwork
 Anne Jakobsen - photography

References 

2005 albums
Hirax albums